Timbiqui Airport  is an airport serving Timbiqui, a town and municipality in the Cauca Department of Colombia. The runway angles northwest from the center of the town.

Airlines and destinations

See also

Transport in Colombia
List of airports in Colombia

References

External links
OpenStreetMap - Timbiqui
OurAirports - Timbiqui

Airports in Colombia